The olive-winged trumpeter (Psophia dextralis) is a species of bird in the family Psophiidae. It is found in the Amazon rainforest of Brazil, but only east of the Tapajós River and west of the Araguaia River. This species was split from Psophia viridis (dark-winged trumpeter) in 2014. As of 2016, this species is listed as an endangered species.

Behavior 
The olive-winged trumpeter lives in dense lowland rainforest away from human contact.

Diet 
The olive-winged trumpeter's diet consists of fruit, small vertebrates, arthropods and carrion.

Threats 
The olive-winged trumpeter is threatened by deforestation and hunting.

Breeding 
The olive-winged trumpeter's breeding is not well documented; all that is known is that its eggs are large.

References

Birds described in 1934